The 2022–23 Miami Heat season is the 35th season for the franchise in the National Basketball Association (NBA).

Draft 

The Heat own their first round pick. They initially had a second-round pick which was forfeited due to tampering violations with respect to Kyle Lowry and free agency in 2021.

Roster

Standings

Division

Conference

Game log

Preseason 

|-style="background:#fcc;
| 1
| October 4
| Minnesota
| 
| Adebayo,  Herro (22)
| Ömer Yurtseven (9)
| Herro, Strus (4)
| FTX Arena19,600
| 0–1
|- style="background:#cfc;"
| 2
| October 6
| @ Brooklyn
| 
| Bam Adebayo (17)
| Jamal Cain (11)
| Highsmith, Jović (5)
| Barclays Center14,058
| 1–1
|- style="background:#cfc;"
| 3
| October 7
| @ Memphis
| 
| Duncan Robinson (29)
| Nikola Jović (8)
| Jamaree Bouyea (8)
| FedExForum14,395
| 2–1
|- style="background:#cfc;"
| 4
| October 10
| Houston
| 
| Max Strus (24)
| Nikola Jović (12)
| Jović, Oladipo, Robinson, Vincent (4)
| FTX Arena19,600
| 3–1
|- style="background:#cfc;"
| 5
| October 12
| New Orleans
| 
| Bam Adebayo (23)
| Kyle Lowry (9)
| Jimmy Butler (6)
| FTX Arena19,600
| 4–1

Regular season

|- style="background:#fcc;
| 1
| October 19
| Chicago
| 
| Jimmy Butler (24)
| Bam Adebayo (9)
| Kyle Lowry (4)
| FTX Arena19,600
| 0–1
|-style="background:#fcc;"
| 2
| October 21
| Boston
| 
| Tyler Herro (25)
| Bam Adebayo (8)
| Kyle Lowry (6)
| FTX Arena19,600
| 0–2
|-style="background:#cfc;"
| 3
| October 22 
| Toronto
| 
| Jimmy Butler (24)
| Tyler Herro (8)
| Herro, Lowry (6)
| FTX Arena19,600
| 1–2
|-style="background:#fcc;"
| 4
| October 24
| Toronto
| 
| Jimmy Butler (26)
| Tyler Herro (15)
| Butler, Herro, Vincent (4)
| FTX Arena19,600
| 1–3
|-style="background:#cfc;
| 5
| October 26
| @ Portland
| 
| Bam Adebayo (18)
| Max Strus (9)
| Gabe Vincent (7)
| Moda Center18,578
| 2–3
|-style="background:#fcc"
| 6
| October 27
| @ Golden State
| 
| Jimmy Butler (27)
| Bam Adebayo (8)
| Butler, Lowry (8)
| Chase Center18,064
| 2–4
|-style="background:#fcc"
| 7
| October 29
| @ Sacramento
| 
| Tyler Herro (34)
| Jimmy Butler (7)
| Jimmy Butler (6)
| Golden 1 Center14,618
| 2–5

|-style="background:#cfc"
| 8
| November 1
| Golden State
| 
| Max Strus (24)
| Gabe Vincent (8)
| Kyle Lowry (9)
| FTX Arena19,600
| 3–5
|-style="background:#cfc"
| 9
| November 2
| Sacramento
| 
| Tyler Herro (26)
| Tyler Herro (12)
| Kyle Lowry (7)
| FTX Arena19,600
| 4–5
|-style="background:#fcc"
| 10
| November 4
| @ Indiana
| 
| Tyler Herro (29)
| Bam Adebayo (10)
| Tyler Herro (5)
| Gainbridge Fieldhouse13,141
| 4–6
|-style="background:#fcc"
| 11
| November 7
| Portland
| 
| Adebayo, Butler, Strus (16)
| Kyle Lowry (7)
| Kyle Lowry (8)
| FTX Arena19,600
| 4–7
|-style="background:#cfc"
| 12
| November 10
| Charlotte
| 
| Jimmy Butler (35)
| Jimmy Butler (10)
| Jimmy Butler (8)
| FTX Arena19,600
| 5–7
|- style="background:#cfc;"
| 13
| November 12
| Charlotte
| 
| Max Strus (31)
| Bam Adebayo (15)
| Butler, Lowry (8)
| FTX Arena19,600
| 6–7
|- style="background:#cfc;"
| 14
| November 14
| Phoenix
| 
| Bam Adebayo (30)
| Jimmy Butler (13)
| Jimmy Butler (7)
| FTX Arena19,600
| 7–7
|- style="background:#fcc;"
| 15
| November 16
| @ Toronto
| 
| Max Strus (20)
| Caleb Martin (9)
| Butler, Vincent (5)
| Scotiabank Arena19,800
| 7–8
|-  style="background:#fcc;"
| 16
| November 18
| @ Washington
| 
| Kyle Lowry (24)
| Haywood Highsmith (13)
| Kyle Lowry (15)
| Capital One Arena18,772
| 7–9
|-  style="background:#fcc;"
| 17
| November 20
| @ Cleveland
| 
| Bam Adebayo (21)
| Bam Adebayo (6)
| Nikola Jović (5)
| Rocket Mortgage FieldHouse19,432
| 7–10
|-style="background:#fcc;"
| 18
| November 21
| @ Minnesota
| 
| Kyle Lowry (21)
| Bam Adebayo (14)
| Kyle Lowry (9)
| Target Center16,583
| 7–11
|-style="background:#cfc;"
| 19
| November 23
| Washington
| 
| Kyle Lowry (28)
| Bam Adebayo (11)
| Martin, Vincent (4)
| FTX Arena19,600
| 8–11
|-style="background:#cfc;"
| 20
| November 25
| Washington
| 
| Bam Adebayo (38)
| Bam Adebayo (12)
| Tyler Herro (10)
| FTX Arena19,600
| 9–11
|-style="background:#cfc;"
| 21
| November 27
| @ Atlanta
| 
| Bam Adebayo (32)
| Tyler Herro (11)
| Tyler Herro (10)
| State Farm Arena17,268
| 10–11
|-style="background:#fcc;"
| 22
| November 30
| @ Boston
| 
| Adebayo, Strus (23)
| Haywood Highsmith (8)
| Tyler Herro (9)
| TD Garden19,156
| 10–12

|-style="background:#cfc;"
| 23
| December 2
| @ Boston
| 
| Bam Adebayo (28)
| Jimmy Butler (15)
| Lowry, Vincent (4)
| TD Garden19,156
| 11–12
|-style="background:#fcc;"
| 24
| December 5
| @ Memphis
| 
| Tyler Herro (28)
| Tyler Herro (13)
| Jimmy Butler (8)
| FedExForum16,122
| 11–13
|-style="background:#fcc;"
| 25
| December 6
| Detroit
| 
| Tyler Herro (34)
| Bam Adebayo (15)
| Herro, Lowry (6)
| FTX Arena19,600
| 11–14
|-style=background:#cfc;"
| 26
| December 8
| L.A. Clippers
| 
| Bam Adebayo (31)
| Bam Adebayo (10)
| Jimmy Butler (8)
| FTX Arena19,600
| 12–14
|-style="background:#fcc;"
| 26
| December 10
| San Antonio
| 
| Jimmy Butler (30)
| Bam Adebayo (9)
| Kyle Lowry (7)
| FTX Arena19,600
| 12–15
|-style="background:#cfc;"
| 27
| December 12
| @ Indiana
| 
| Bam Adebayo (22)
| Bam Adebayo (17)
| Tyler Herro (6)
| Gainbridge Fieldhouse15,309
| 13–15
|-style="background:#cfc;"
| 28
| December 14
| @ Oklahoma City 
| 
| Tyler Herro (35)
| Bam Adebayo (13)
| Kyle Lowry (6)
| Paycom Center14,783
| 14–15
|-style="background:#cfc;"
| 30
| December 15
| @ Houston
| 
| Tyler Herro (41)
| Jimmy Butler (10)
| Jimmy Butler (7)
| Toyota Center16,210
| 15–15
|-style="background:#cfc;"
| 31
| December 17
| @ San Antonio
| 
| Jimmy Butler (26)
| Bam Adebayo (13)
| Tyler Herro (7)
| Mexico City Arena20,160
| 16–15
|-style="background:#fcc;"
| 32
| December 20
| Chicago
| 
| Bam Adebayo (27)
| Bam Adebayo (12)
| Tyler Herro (7)
| FTX Arena19,969
| 16–16
|-style="background:#fcc;"
| 33
| December 23
| Indiana
| 
| Tyler Herro (28)
| Bam Adebayo (7)
| Kyle Lowry (5)
| FTX Arena19,600
| 16–17
|-style="background:#cfc;"
| 34
| December 26
| Minnesota
| 
| Max Strus (19)
| Orlando Robinson (9)
| Kyle Lowry (9)
| FTX Arena19,911
| 17–17
|-style="background:#cfc;"
| 35
| December 28
| L.A. Lakers
| 
| Jimmy Butler (27)
| Bam Adebayo (14)
| Tyler Herro (9)
| FTX Arena20,221
| 18–17
|-style="background:#fcc;"
| 36
| December 30
| @ Denver
| 
| Tyler Herro (26)
| Tyler Herro (10)
| Jimmy Butler (8)
| Ball Arena19,638
| 18–18
|-style="background:#cfc;"
| 37
| December 31
| @ Utah
| 
| Bam Adebayo (32)
| Tyler Herro (9)
| Herro, Strus (6)
| Vivint Arena18,206
| 19–18

|-style="background:#cfc;"
| 38
| January 2
| @ L.A. Clippers
| 
| Bam Adebayo (31)
| Bam Adebayo (13)
| Jimmy Butler (6)
| Crypto.com Arena19,068
| 20–18
|-style="background:#fcc;"
| 39
| January 4
| @ L.A. Lakers
| 
| Bam Adebayo (30)
| Bam Adebayo (13)
| Victor Oladipo (5)
| Crypto.com Arena18,997
| 20–19
|- style="background:#cfc;"
| 40
| January 6
| @ Phoenix
| 
| Victor Oladipo (26)
| Bam Adebayo (11)
| Jimmy Butler (6)
| Footprint Center17,071
| 21–19
|- style="background:#fcc;"
| 41
| January 8
| Brooklyn
| 
| Jimmy Butler (26)
| Orlando Robinson (9)
| Victor Oladipo (6)
| FTX Arena19,901
| 21–20
|- style="background:#cfc;"
| 42
| January 10
| Oklahoma City
| 
| Jimmy Butler (35)
| Butler, Strus (7)
| Butler, Oladipo, Vincent (4)
| FTX Arena19,600
| 22–20
|- style="background:#cfc;"
| 43
| January 12
| Milwaukee
| 
| Gabe Vincent (28)
| Bam Adebayo (12)
| Victor Oladipo (8)
| FTX Arena19,600
| 23–20
|-style="background:#cfc;"
| 44
| January 14
| Milwaukee
| 
| Gabe Vincent (27)
| Bam Adebayo (13)
| Victor Oladipo (5)
| Miami-Dade Arena19,620
| 24–20
|-style="background:#fcc;"
| 45
| January 16
| @ Atlanta
| 
| Jimmy Butler (34)
| Bam Adebayo (13)
| Victor Oladipo (10)
| State Farm Arena18,007
| 24–21
|-style="background:#cfc;"
| 46
| January 18
| @ New Orleans
| 
| Bam Adebayo (26)
| Adebayo, Lowry (8)
| Max Strus (10)
| Smoothie King Center17,736
| 25–21
|-style="background:#fcc;"
| 47
| January 20
| @ Dallas
| 
| Victor Oladipo (20)
| Bam Adebayo (11)
| Bam Adebayo (4)
| American Airlines Center20,326
| 25–22
|-style="background:#cfc;"
| 48
| January 22
| New Orleans
| 
| Tyler Herro (26)
| Bam Adebayo (9)
| Victor Oladipo (5)
| Miami-Dade Arena19,600
| 26–22
|-style="background:#cfc;"
| 49
| January 24
| Boston
| 
| Bam Adebayo (30)
| Bam Adebayo (15)
| Kyle Lowry (8)
| Miami-Dade Arena19,705
| 27–22
|-style="background:#cfc;"
| 50
| January 27
| Orlando
| 
| Jimmy Butler (29)
| Caleb Martin (7)
| Bam Adebayo (7)
| Miami-Dade Arena19,788
| 28–22
|-style="background:#fcc;"
| 51
| January 29
| @ Charlotte
| 
| Jimmy Butler (28)
| Jimmy Butler (7)
| Bam Adebayo (6)
| Spectrum Center19,254
| 28–23
|-style="background:#cfc;"
| 52
| January 31
| @ Cleveland
| 
| Jimmy Butler (23)
| Bam Adebayo (11)
| Victor Oladipo (6)
| Rocket Mortgage FieldHouse19,432
| 29–23

|-style="background:#fcc;"
| 53
| February 2
| @ New York
| 
| Bam Adebayo (32)
| Bam Adebayo (9)
| Tyler Herro (8)
| Madison Square Garden19,044
| 29–24
|-style="background:#fcc;"
| 54
| February 4
| @ Milwaukee
| 
| Jimmy Butler (32)
| Bam Adebayo (11)
| Bam Adebayo (8)
| Fiserv Forum18,008
| 29–25
|-style="background:#cfc;"
| 55
| February 8
| Indiana
| 
| Bam Adebayo (38)
| Caleb Martin (11)
| Jimmy Butler (7)
| Miami-Dade Arena19,600
| 30–25
|-style="background:#cfc;"
| 56
| February 10
| Houston
| 
| Tyler Herro (31)
| Adebayo, Herro, Martin (9)
| Tyler Herro (8)
| Miami-Dade Arena19,600
| 31–25
|-style="background:#cfc;"
| 57
| February 11
| @ Orlando
| 
| Tyler Herro (23)
| Bam Adebayo (17)
| Max Strus (7)
| Amway Center18,223
| 32–25
|-style="background:#fcc;"
| 58
| February 13
| Denver
| 
| Jimmy Butler (24)
| Jimmy Butler (10)
| Jimmy Butler (9)
| Miami-Dade Arena19,755
| 32–26
|-style="background:#fcc;"
| 59
| February 15
| @ Brooklyn
| 
| Bam Adebayo (24)
| Bam Adebayo (13)
| Adebayo, Butler (6)
| Barclays Center17,963
| 32–27
|-style="background:#fcc;"
| 60
| February 24
| @ Milwaukee
| 
| Jimmy Butler (23)
| Kevin Love (8)
| Love, Strus (4)
| Fiserv Forum17,676
| 32–28
|-style="background:#fcc;"
| 61
| February 25
| @ Charlotte
| 
| Tyler Herro (33)
| Kevin Love (13)
| Jimmy Butler (6)
| Spectrum Center19,109
| 32–29
|-style="background:#cfc;"
| 62
| February 27
| @ Philadelphia
| 
| Jimmy Butler (23)
| Jimmy Butler (11)
| Jimmy Butler (9)
| Wells Fargo Center20,859
| 33–29

|-style="background:#fcc;"
| 63
| March 1
| Philadelphia
| 
| Bam Adebayo (20)
| Bam Adebayo (8)
| Tyler Herro (6)
| Miami-Dade Arena19,600
| 33–30
|-style="background:#fcc;"
| 64
| March 3
| New York
| 
| Jimmy Butler (33)
| Butler, Herro, Love (8)
| Tyler Herro (6)
| Miami-Dade Arena19,600
| 33–31
|-style="background:#cfc;"
| 65
| March 4
| Atlanta
| 
| Bam Adebayo (30)
| Adebayo, Butler (11)
| Jimmy Butler (7)
| Miami-Dade Arena19,600
| 34–31
|-style="background:#cfc;"
| 66
| March 6
| Atlanta
| 
| Jimmy Butler (26)
| Jimmy Butler (9)
| Jimmy Butler (9)
| Miami-Dade Arena19,600
| 35–31
|-style="background:#fcc;"
| 67
| March 8
| Cleveland
| 
| Jimmy Butler (28)
| Love, Zeller (8)
| Butler, Herro (5)
| Miami-Dade Arena19,600
| 35–32
|-style="background:#cfc;"
| 68
| March 10
| Cleveland
| 
| Jimmy Butler (33)
| Tyler Herro (9)
| Adebayo, Herro (4)
| Miami-Dade Arena19,757
| 36–32
|-style="background:#fcc;"
| 69
| March 11
| @ Orlando
| 
| Jimmy Butler (38)
| Bam Adebayo (7)
| Kyle Lowry (4)
| Amway Center17,347
| 36–33
|-style="background:#cfc;"
| 70
| March 13
| Utah
| 
| Jimmy Butler (24)
| Bam Adebayo (9)
| Butler, Lowry (4)
| Miami-Dade Arena19,721
| 37–33
|-style="background:#cfc;"
| 71
| March 15
| Memphis
| 
| Bam Adebayo (26)
| Adebayo, Butler (8)
| Butler, Herro, Strus (6)
| Miami-Dade Arena19,794
| 38–33
|-style="background:#fcc;"
| 72
| March 18
| @ Chicago
| 
| Jimmy Butler (24)
| Adebayo, Butler, Herro (7)
| Adebayo, Strus, Vincent (4) 
| United Center20,094
| 38–34
|-style="background:#cfc;"
| 73
| March 19
| @ Detroit
| 
| Jimmy Butler (26)
| Bam Adebayo (10)
| Jimmy Butler (10)
| Little Caesars Arena20,190
| 39–34
|-
| 74
| March 22
| New York
| 
| 
|  
|  
| Miami-Dade Arena
| 
|-
| 75
| March 25
| Brooklyn
| 
| 
|  
|  
| Miami-Dade Arena
| 
|-
| 76
| March 28
| @ Toronto
| 
| 
|  
|  
| Scotiabank Arena
| 
|-
| 77
| March 29
| @ New York
| 
| 
|  
|  
| Madison Square Garden
| 
|-

Transactions

Trades

Free agency

Re-signed

Additions

Subtractions

References 

Miami Heat seasons
Miami Heat
Miami Heat
Miami Heat